Tre Jean-Marie (born 13 April 1993) is a British songwriter and record producer. His writing and production credits include AJ Tracey, Anne-Marie, Burna Boy, Craig David, Jacob Banks, Joy Crookes, Kaytranada, Labrinth, Little Mix, Mabel, Nathan Dawe, Paloma Faith, and Tom Grennan amongst many others.

Early life
Jean-Marie was born in Hackney, London and is of Trinidadian and St. Lucian descent. He is the son of singer-songwriters Lincoln Jean-Marie and Valerie-Suzette Jean-Marie.

Career
In 2016, Jean-Marie became a frequent collaborator of the British artist Craig David, for whom he co-wrote and produced 15 tracks across Following My Intuition and The Time Is Now which peaked at number 1 and 2 respectively on the UK album chart.

In 2020, he co-wrote, produced, and mixed “Lighter” by Nathan Dawe featuring KSI which peaked at number 3 on the UK singles chart, was named one of the biggest selling songs of 2020, and went on to be nominated for Best British Single at the 2021 BRIT Awards. He also performed the same duties on Nathan Dawe’s follow-up singles “No Time for Tears” with Little Mix, and “Way Too Long” with Anne-Marie & MoStack.

In addition, Jean-Marie owns publishing company Decibel. Decibel publishes songs on many chart-topping records including A$AP Rocky's At. Long. Last. ASAP and Ariana Grande's Dangerous Woman.

Selective songwriting and production discography

Awards and nominations 
{| class="wikitable sortable plainrowheaders"
|-
! scope="col" | Award
! scope="col" | Year
! scope="col" | Recipient(s) and nominee(s)
! scope="col" | Category
! scope="col" | Result
! scope="col" class="unsortable"| 
|-
!scope="row"| Amazon Music UK
| 2020
| rowspan="2" | Lighter
| Best Song
| 
| 
|-
!scope="row"| The BRIT Awards
| rowspan="2" | 2021
| Best British Single
| 
| 
|-
! rowspan="3" scope="row"| The A&R Awards
| rowspan="3" | Himself
| rowspan="2" | Producer of the Year
| 
| 
|-
| rowspan="2" | 2022
| 
| 
|-
| Songwriter of the Year
| 
|

References

1993 births
Living people
English songwriters
English record producers
Black British musicians
People from Hackney Central
People educated at Spalding Grammar School